Capital Brewery is a brewery in Middleton, Wisconsin. Founded on March 14, 1984, by entrepreneur Ed Janus in Madison, Wisconsin, it is situated in a former egg processing plant.  The company first began production in 1986 and now produces over 20,000 barrels of beer annually. It produces 24 distinct beers, of which nine are annuals, five are seasonal, and ten are limited edition. Most are made using the strict Reinheitsgebot guidelines.

The company's brews have won awards at a number of competitions, including the Great American Beer Festival, and The Great Taste of the Midwest. The brewery was awarded the distinction of Madison's Favorite Local/Regional Beer from 1998 to 2004 in The Capital Times/Wisconsin State Journal Reader's Choice Awards. The company has received over 240 major awards in both domestic and international competitions in over 15 categories, and the flagship Wisconsin Amber beer has been available in cans since 1997.

Capital Brewery was named "America's #1 Rated Brewery" by the Beverage Testing Institute's World Beer Championships in 1998. The brewery was also rated #7 in the world at this time.

Capital was named the Grand National Champion in the 2013 US Open Beer Championship, winning six medals.

Capital Brewery’s beers are currently distributed in four Midwestern States: Wisconsin, Iowa, Illinois, and Minnesota.

Capital Brewery has an indoor Bierstube as well as a large outdoor Bier garten (a.k.a. 'Middleton's Backyard') that plays host to events throughout the year. One of the more notable events is Bockfest, held on the last Saturday of February. Bockfest ushers in the annual release of Capital Blonde Doppelbock, Capital's award-winning brew.  Blonde Doppelbock has been awarded platinum six times in the past ten years at the World Beer Championships.

The Capital Brewery Bike Club was formed in 2009 and currently has over 400 members. The bicycle rides are held Tuesday and Thursday evenings from April through October (weather permitting) and start from the Bier garten.

Beers produced

Annual 
Supper Club
Special Pilsner
Wisconsin Amber
Capital Dark
Mutiny IPA (Capital Brewery's First India Pale Ale)
Island Wheat

Seasonal 

Maibock - Available March - May
Lake House - Available June - July
Oktoberfest - Available August - October
Autumnal Fire September - December
Winter Skal - Available November - Feb.

Limited release (some are included in the 'Capital Square Series')

Blonde Dopplebock (Winter/Spring)
Fishin' in the Dark (Summer)
Dark Dopplebock (Fall/Winter)
Jobu (Brown Ale aged in rum barrels - Winter)
Capital Coffee Dark (Coffee/vanilla infused Munich Dark)

Beers in hibernation 

Bavarian Lager
Brown Ale - Went into hibernation in Spring 2009 (except for an occasional appearance as Jobu)
Capital 1900 - Hibernating since 2006.
Hop Cream
Weizen
U.S. Pale Ale
Dark Voyage (dark IPA)
Ghost Ship (white IPA)
Grateful IPA (red IPA)
Jacked Maibock (Spring)
Capsized
Appleanche (Fall)
Pumpkinataur (Fall)
Eternal Flame (Fall/Winter)
Schwarz in a Box (Fall/Winter)

References

External links

Capital Brewery Bicycle Club website

Beer brewing companies based in Wisconsin
1984 establishments in Wisconsin
Food and drink companies established in 1984